Cynisca is a genus in the family Amphisbaenidae, commonly known as worm lizards. 20 species are placed in this genus.

Species
Cynisca bifrontalis  - French Congo worm lizard
Cynisca chirioi 
Cynisca degrysi  - Sierra Leone worm lizard
Cynisca feae  - ugly worm lizard
Cynisca gansi 
Cynisca haugi  - Haug's worm lizard
Cynisca ivoirensis 
Cynisca kigomensis 
Cynisca kraussi  - Ghana worm lizard
Cynisca leonina  - Los Archipelago worm lizard
Cynisca leucura  - coast worm lizard
Cynisca liberiensis  - Liberia worm lizard
Cynisca manei 
Cynisca muelleri 
Cynisca nigeriensis 
Cynisca oligopholis  - Cassine River worm lizard
Cynisca rouxae 
Cynisca schaeferi  - Cameroon worm lizard
Cynisca senegalensis 
Cynisca williamsi 

Nota bene: A binomial authority in parentheses indicates that the species was originally described in a genus other than Cynisca.

References
 "Cynisca ". The Reptile Database. www.reptile-database.org.

Further reading

Gans C (2005). "Checklist and Bibliography of the Amphisbaenia of the World". Bull. American Mus. Nat. Hist. (289): 1–130.

 
Lizard genera
Taxa named by André Marie Constant Duméril
Taxa named by Gabriel Bibron